Nina Yankowitz is an American visual artist known for her work in new media technology, site specific public works, and installation art. She is a National Endowment for the Arts fellow, and a Pollock-Krasner Foundation Award recipient.

Biography

Yankowitz was born in Newark, NJ, and later lived in South Orange, NJ. She graduated from Columbia High School, and later from the School of Visual Arts in New York in 1969. Yankowitz became a faculty member in the graduate school at UMass Amherst in 1971. During the fall of 1975, Yankowitz was a visiting artist in residence at the Art Institute of Chicago where she first met her future husband, architect Barry Holden. Yankowitz and Holden met again in the 1980s in New York, and married in 1986. They had a son, Ian, in 1989 who is a film and documentary editor. Her image is included in the iconic 1972 poster Some Living American Women Artists by Mary Beth Edelson.

Art projects

Yankowitz creates video projections, and/or time-based artwork installations and permanent artworks sited in the public realm. She sometimes works with technology teams to create interactive games. She states:

To enhance individual awareness of societal or environmental conditions I sometimes infuse interactive games and social networking tools into sculptural or virtual elements in my installations. My video projections are created to challenge and stretch commonly accepted definitions of reality.

Criss~Crossing The Divine 
Criss~Crossing The Divine is a virtual sanctuary that addresses the ever-expanding religious intolerance fueling ISIS and global wars. Visitors play the team's interactive games while robotic mannequins, representing devotees from each faith, perform a quintessential gesture like actors onstage communicating in her video projecting on a wall. People use interactive wands to curate topics and assign more or less importance to each topic they select while the team's software parses and integrates all the more or less importance assignments the person makes. This process ultimately determines which three hundred color-coded scriptures will appear. The participant is often surprised by what they find after visiting a website to learn from which religions their color-coded scripture results were sourced. Playing the games developed with the global team, acknowledges that as the world turns, our personal perspectives change and accordingly what we search to find within the scriptures shifts. This insures this kind of search can never settle into a permanent groove. The goal is to ask new questions that yield new perspectives from individual quests, ad infinitum and with no amen.  It is an updated version of "CROSSINGS"—An interactive installation with games developed with her team during 2007-08. It premiered at the Thessaloniki Biennale in Greece 2009. She conceived and designed the art project as "House of Worships Not Warships" in 2000.

Nina Yankowitz and other original “The Third Woman” team members Martin Rieser, Pia Tikka, Anna Dumitriu, directed original interactive film/game interventions.

“The Third Woman Interactive performance Film/Game” was directed by Nina Yankowitz, based on filmmakers Pia Tikka and Martin Rieser’s “The Third Woman” movie. 
The Team comprised interactive option texts creators Pia Tikka and Martin Rieser, costume designer Margarita Jahrmann, interactive technologist Rasmus Vuori, data dimensions researcher Mauri Kaipainen, Dance direction collaborator Abby Cassell, Sound artist Dylan Marcus, at the Galapagos Theater Dumbo in Brooklyn N.Y. May 2011. The film is only one element in the complex interactive event. Margarette Jahrmann’s QR code costumes link to Pia Tikka & Martin Rieser “The Third Woman” film clips.        “The Algorithmics”, consisting of untrained dancers, performed QR code shape patterns and smartphone instructions onstage. Ultimately they walked into the audience inviting them to scan their QR code costume text options links to vote on the re-arrangement of movie clips based on characters in the film. Audience choices aggregate in real time by Rasmus Vuori computing majority movie option votes and the new version of audience directed “The Third Woman” movie plays on a large video screen at the end of the event.

http://nyartprojects.com/Videos/Third_Woman_FilmGame_NY_Documentary.mp4

Link NY event Video by Martin Rieser

Prior team project is discussed at
</ref> May 2012. Prior team versions were created with other original team members: Pia Tikka, Martin Rieser, Anna Dumitri, Barry Roshto, Nita Tandon, Cliona Harmey, and others was shown at the Kunsthalle, Vienna, Greek State Museum of Contemporary Art in Greece.

Global Warming Bursting Seams

It is a site-specific installation at the Museumsquartier in Vienna 2012. A digitally mapped window was created over an actual window for people to look through and see her video projections displaying environmental disasters caused by Global warming conditions. Simultaneously, virtual water is seeping through the museum's masonry wall.

ShatterFloodMudHouses

ShatterFloodMudHouses is an HD video animation displaying a portrait exposing, confronting, and forecasting environmental and societal decay. A generic glass house is viewed spinning through myriad cycles inherent in the causal effects of erratic global warming weather, political divisiveness, and the ever-expanding intolerance of differences. Blurring edges between solid and fictive space questions the real-to-reel while shattering expectations of norms into particles of dust. Viewers are lulled and suddenly tossed between calm and brutal disturbances by interventions that shatter and assault psychological, physical and auditory space.

Kiosk.edu

An aluminum and glass and house that reflects quotes from artists, architects, and performers. These were mined from contemporary and art historical excavations. It was designed to inform the public about the personal and conceptual journeys these artists traveled in their creative processes.  The house is lighted from within and illuminates the texts. At nighttime, the words seem to hover above the ground. It was installed at the Architectural Institute of America in New York City (2003), The Chicago Art Fair (2005), and the garden of the Guild Hall Art Museum garden in E. Hampton N.Y. during 2005.

CloudHouse
An aluminum and tempered glass house that generates a water vapor cloud changing shape due to the external weather conditions. 6'-4" X 8'-4" x 7'-2". Sag Harbor, New York, 2005

Buried Treasures/Secrets in the Sciences
Buried Treasures/ Secrets in the Sciences is an installation composed with video projections interacting with a science laboratory tableau. Virtual texts, seen spilling from an actual glass tube, float on fictive liquid mercury and tell stories about women in the sciences who are unrecognized for their contributions. 2009, National Academy Museum, New York 2011

With a continued interest in merging elements from the sciences and the arts, an endeavor begun during the 1970s when her Paint Reading Scores linked underlying concepts of synesthesia to artistic practice, she found herself unearthing some women not recognized for their contributions in the sciences during the time of their discoveries.

Truth or Consequences: An Interactive Global Warming Game

Truth or Consequences: An Interactive Global Warming Game with Barry Holden and Martin Rieser. The game enables participants to interact with a video projection or QR code costumes to opine about global warming weather conditions that threaten our universe. Isea2012 attendees used smart phones to scan the codes and choose options, from a menu of possible global warming outcomes, that best reflect their views about the environmental dilemmas we face today. A tally of the most voted upon options that ISEA2012 participants made are available to view at a dedicated website after the conference closing.

The QR code was chosen as a near universal interaction device, enabling audiences to collaborate using mobile phones regardless of platform. Before entering the space, people were invited to download a free QR code scanner to their smart phones. They then encountered a large (9'x16') video projecting a landscape displaying various effects of global warming weather conditions that threaten the habitat. The animated pastiche included: atmospheric, water, geological formations, and flora and fauna found within the New Mexico borders.

Embedded animations peppered the landscape image projection. For example, rocks in the projection slowly cracked and crumbled, revealing molten lava possibly spreading and smothering the earth. Or a peaceful animation of a rippling mountain lake slowly moving abruptly evaporates and changes into a withered, barren lakebed. These animations looped on the wall for 15 seconds until an image froze on a QR Code embedded in an area of the landscape projection. The audience could then scan these live codes with smart phones to review issues and choose responses from a menu of text options presenting possible reactions to global warming threats.

After the presentation, the team wore shirts with printed interactive codes for other ISEA2012 attendees to engage with the game/survey. All were instructed to choose options they believe best reflects their personal views about today's environmental dilemmas.

Exhibition and shows

Select museum exhibitions
 2014 Criss~Crossing The Divine, Guild Hall Museum, East Hampton, NY
 2014 Glass House Spins Bare Bones with Sound, BRIC Arts Media House, Brooklyn, NY
 2013 Pop Rally, Museum of Modern Art, NY
 2012 Global Warming Bursting Seams, Museum Quarter, Curator Ruth Schnell-Dr. Jahrmann, Vienna
 2011 Dilated Paint Readings, & Scenario Sounds, Museum of Modern Art, Kiev, Curator Koan Jeff Baysa
 2010  Buried Treasures/Secrets in Science, National Academy Museum New York 185th Annual Exhibition, NYC
 2009 The Third Woman, Interactive Film collaboration, Kunsthalle, Vienna
 2009 The Third Woman, Interactive film & Interventions, Thessaloniki Biennale State Mus.Of Art Greece
 2009 Crossings, team- Interactive Installation, Thessaloniki Biennale State Mus.Of contemp. Art Greece
 2005 Kiosk.EDU, Guild Hall Art Museum, East Hampton, NY
 1990 Think Negative, Series With Moving Sphere, Yankowitz & Holden, Katonah Museum of Art, The Technological Muse
 1982 "Hell's Breath, P.S.1 MOMA Queens, NY
 1973 Canvas Thread Readings,The Inaugural Whitney Biennial at the Whitney Museum of American Art, NY

Select solo exhibitions
 2012 Global Warming Bursting Seams, Museum Quarter, Curator Ruth Schnell-Dr. Jahrmann, Vienna
 2011  The Third Woman, Interactive Performance and film/Game, Galapagos Theater Space, NY
 2009 Buried Treasure, Mishkin Gallery, NY
 2005 Kiosk.Edu, The Garden, Guild Hall Museum, E. Hampton, NY
 1982 Hell's Breath, P.S.1 MOMA Queens, NY

Select public works
 2005-06 Interactive Poetry Walk, Yankowitz & Holden, East Cleveland Euclid Corridor Project, OH
 2002 Idanha Canopy Facade Project, Yankowitz & Holden, Boise, ID
 1997 American Myths Stone Facade, Albright College Campus Center, PA
 1997 The Garden of Games and The Garden of Scientific Ideas, 2 rooftop gardens, Yankowitz & Holden,  IS. 145 Queens, NY
 1998 Mosaic Mural51 ST.& Lex. Ave. 115 ft. , NYC
 1986 12' Mosaic Wall, Mr.& Mrs. Sydney Lewis, VA

Select curatorial projects
 2013 Curatorial team for ART GALLERY SIGGRAPH Asia 2013, Hong Kong
 2005 Curator, Chicago Art Fair, Public Art Section, Yankowitz and Holden, IL
 1996 Curator, Bare Bones Painters/Sculptors/Architects from 1960's-1996 at Frederieka Taylor/TZArt NY
 Artists include: Baer; Goodell; Gorchov; Kennedy;Leopold; Lewitt; Paine; Potric; Marcaccio Moffett; Rockburne; Stackhouse; Scully; Stella; Westfall; Yoder;
 Architects include: Archigram; Hadid; Kennedy & Violich; Ohlhausen & Prentice & Chan; Davis & Brody; Myong; Park; Renzo; Piano; Assympote: Rashi & Cotoure
 1997 Co-Chair, Lone Rangers College Art Association Conference, NY
 1988 Private Works for Public Spaces, Yankowitz & Jenny Dixon; R.C.Erpf Gallery, NY

Awards and honors
Yankowitz received a National Endowment for the Arts fellowship in 1979 and in 1981. She was a recipient of the prestigious Pollock-Krasner Foundation Grant in 1997. She was an artist in residence at the American Academy in Rome in 2001.  Yankowitz was a curatorial reviewer on a 12-person global committee team for Art Gallery/SIGGRAPH Asia in Hong Kong 2013. She was also the co-curator for the Chicago Art Fair 2005 Public Art Section.
 United States Artists grant~Interactive team project-Pinball Brain Game Whiz 2011/12
 Visiting Artist, American Academy in Rome, 2001
 Pollock-Krasner Foundation Grant, NYC 1997-8
 National Endowment For the Arts, Art in Public Places 1981
 National Endowment for the Arts, Individual artist grant1979
 C.A.P.S. Grant, New York State Council on the Arts 1976
 MacDowell Colony, NH, "Artists in Residence" 1972
 Fine Arts Center in Provincetown, Provincetown, Mass 1977
 The City Center of New York, "5 Pieces for the Stage" 1969
 New York City Parks Dept., Central Park Sculpture 1969

Publications
 
 
 1981 "Scenario Sounds" by Nina Yankowitz, published Street Editions, Reprint 2007 NYartProjects LLC
 1979 Voices of the Eye, by Nina Yankowitz, published by Stefanotti Gallery

Select reviews, articles, and catalogues
 2014 Nina Yankowitz: Searching Sacred Texts, East Hampton Star, Mark Segal, July 8
 2014 Nina Yankowitz Re-Rights/Re-Writes: Works from 1967-2012, Woman's Art Journal, by Joyce Beckenstein, Editor Joan Marter
 2014 NY Times, Playing Word Games With Sacred Texts, By Joyce Beckenstein July 11, 2014
 2011 Third Woman Interactive Performance/Film Game, Critics Pick New York Time Out Magazine
 2010 NY Times, Academy Gives Art Some Wiggle Room, By Karen Rosenberg Feb.18, 2010
 2010 Not Just the Whitney Biennial, – Artopia, by John Perrault
 2009 The Heretics, Joan Braderman, Art Forum Mag. By Ed Halter Oct.
 2009 Interactive Storytelling: Second Joint International Conference, Page 340, 360 Martin Rieser, Pia Tikka (Finland), Nina Yankowitz (USA)
 2005  New Sculpture Speaks Volumes, Southampton Press,  by Pat Rogers August 11
 2004  Outside/In, Art News Magazine, Lily Wei, March pg. 134
 2002  Nina Yankowitz Art Of The Moment, The East Hampton Star, Robert Long
 1999 Public Art Review, Fall/Winter '99 issue 21, volume II
 1998 NY Times, Fresh Looks at Prints and a Town, Helen Harrison, Sept. 13
 1997 NY Times, Oct. 31, Holland Cotter
 1996 Kansas City Star, Fri. Aug. 30
 1995 Art Press, French Edition, Author Sol Ostrow
 1983 NY Times,  Art-The Case for Crafts, Grace Glueck, July 8
 1973 NY Times, Peter Schjeldahl, April 1
 1972 NY Times, Can Women Have 'One-Man' Shows?, Cindy Nemser, Jan. 9
 1971 NY Times, Cheops Would Approve,'' James R. Mellow,  Dec. 5

References

External links
 Yankowitz listing at the Brooklyn Museum website

1946 births
Living people
American installation artists
American women installation artists
Feminist artists
National Endowment for the Arts Fellows
New media artists
Jewish American artists
Artists from Newark, New Jersey
20th-century American artists
20th-century American women artists
21st-century American artists
21st-century American women artists
21st-century American Jews
American women curators
American curators